Kris Brand (born December 25, 1983 in Dawson Creek, BC) is a Canadian professional volleyball player. He is the youngest of 3 boys. His position on the field is outside hitter. Most recently, Kris played with 4 Eylul Belediye (Sivas, Turkey) and won the A2 Championship. He then transferred on to play in Qatar to finish the 2010/11 season with Army Team. Season 2009/2010 he played in Bamberg, Germany for the 1st division team VC Franken where he finished the season 4th in scoring. He reached the play-offs with his team in their first year in the A2 Division of Greek volleyball. 2008/2009 he went to Greece after only 1 season with Belgian champions Knack Randstad Roeselare, where he was main spiker of the team together with Ivan Contreras. Brand used to play for Saskatchewan Huskies volleyball team before coming to Belgium. He studied Arts & Science at the University of Saskatchewan.

References

External links
Kris Brand's Personal CV and Video website
Kris Brand's YouTube Channel
Kris Brand profile at knack-roeselare.be 

1983 births
Living people
Canadian expatriate sportspeople in Belgium
Canadian men's volleyball players
People from Dawson Creek
Saskatchewan Huskies players
Sportspeople from British Columbia